Heterosphaeria is a genus of fungi in the family Helotiaceae. The genus contains 6 species.

References

Helotiaceae